Samuel Davis Shannon (May 3, 1833 – September 9, 1896) was an American soldier and politician who served as the 7th Secretary of the Wyoming Territory as a Democrat.

Life

Samuel Davis Shannon was born on May 3, 1833 in South Carolina and during the Civil War married Elizabeth Peton Giles. In December 1860 in joined the Confederate Army and was given the rank of captain and during the American Civil War he served on the staff of Major General Richard H. Anderson.

Following the Civil War he became a journalist, but later moved to Denver, Colorado due to poor health and then to Cheyenne, Wyoming. On April 9, 1887 he was appointed by President Grover Cleveland as Secretary of the Wyoming Territory and served until July 1, 1889. Following his tenure he returned to the eastern United States and was later placed into a Soldier's Home in Pikesville, Maryland where he died from Bright's disease on September 9, 1896.

References

1834 births
1896 deaths
19th-century American politicians
Confederate States Army officers
People from Camden, South Carolina
People of South Carolina in the American Civil War
Politicians from Cheyenne, Wyoming
Secretaries of State of Wyoming
Wyoming Democrats